The Rabat barbel (Luciobarbus rabatensis) is a species of cyprinid fish endemic to Bou Regreg River basin in northern Morocco.

References

Rabat barbel
Endemic fauna of Morocco
Freshwater fish of North Africa
Rabat barbel